State Route 58 (SR 58) is a major east-west state highway in the U.S. state of California that runs across the Coast Ranges, the southern San Joaquin Valley, the Tehachapi Mountains, which border the southern Sierra Nevada, and the Mojave Desert. It runs between U.S. Route 101 near Santa Margarita and Interstate 15 in Barstow. It has junctions with Interstate 5 near Buttonwillow, State Route 99 in Bakersfield, State Route 202 in Tehachapi, State Route 14 near Mojave, and U.S. Route 395 at Kramer Junction. SR 58 also provides access to Edwards Air Force Base. At various points it is known as the Calf Canyon Highway, Carrisa Highway, Bakersfield-McKittrick Highway, Rosa Parks Highway, Rosedale Highway, Barstow-Bakersfield Highway, Bakersfield Tehachapi Highway, Kern County Korean War Veterans Memorial Highway, and Mojave-Barstow Highway.

Route description

State Route 58 between Santa Margarita and Buttonwillow is a winding mountain road through a thinly populated area. From its westernmost terminus at US 101 near Santa Margarita, a few miles north of San Luis Obispo, SR 58 heads east along the former US 101 (El Camino Real) for one mile. SR 58 then heads east and up the winding mountain road, passing through a thinly populated area and an intersection with SR 229. Alternatives such as SR 46 to the north or SR 166 to the south are recommended, as much of this section of SR 58 is prohibited to truck traffic. However, this section of SR 58 does pass through the Carrizo Plain, which is known for its scenic beauty and geological features, including the San Andreas Fault. SR 58 then takes another winding road before joining with State Route 33 (SR 33) in the small town of McKittrick. SR 33 then splits at the north end of McKittrick before SR 58 then enters another, but brief winding road. SR 58 then proceeds northeast for several miles before changing to an east-west alignment and reaching Buttonwillow. A few miles later, SR 58 has an interchange with Interstate 5 (I-5).

State Route 58 joins State Route 99 for about  through Bakersfield before splitting as a freeway and heading east. SR 58 briefly enters expressway status with two at-grade intersections in the Caliente area before resuming freeway status east of Caliente. SR 58 then reaches the Tehachapi city limits and traverses the Tehachapi Pass before dropping out of the Tehachapi Mountains into the Antelope Valley at the town of Mojave. Freeway conditions continue from State Route 14 east of Mojave bypassing North Edwards, Edwards Air Force Base, Boron, and Kramer Junction.

With the lack of four-lane or greater, divided highways that cross the Sierra Nevada between SR 58 at the Tehachapi Pass and Interstate 80 at Donner Summit about hundreds of miles to the north, I-5 and SR 58 are used by motorists to travel between Northern California and points to the southeast, such as Las Vegas (via I-15) and Interstate 40, without having to face the extreme traffic congestion of greater Los Angeles.

SR 58 is part of the California Freeway and Expressway System, and east of I-5 is part of the National Highway System, a network of highways that are considered essential to the country's economy, defense, and mobility by the Federal Highway Administration. SR 58 is eligible for the State Scenic Highway System, but it is not officially designated as a scenic highway by the California Department of Transportation. SR 58 has several names throughout its length, including the Blue Star Memorial Highway (for its entire length); the Kern County Korean War Veterans Memorial Highway, for the section from SR 184 to the Kern County/San Bernardino County Line; and the Rosa Parks Highway, for the section between SR 99 and SR 184. The Korean War Veterans name honors the approximately 8,120 veterans from Kern County, while the section named for Rosa Parks honors the civil rights activist. The portion of SR 58 from Barstow to Bakersfield is sometimes referred to as the Barstow–Bakersfield Highway.

History

State Route 58 did not exist as a California sign route until 1964, although previous to 1964, it was part of California Legislative Route 58. The other part of Legislative Route 58 is California's segment of Interstate 40; previous to 1964 it was a segment of US 66.

Prior to 1964, the segment of State Route 58 between Bakersfield and Barstow was signed U.S. Route 466. Also at that time, the segment of SR 58 between State Route 33 at McKittrick and State Route 99 in Bakersfield was signed as State Route 178. Although it was proposed for signing as Route 178 in 1934, the segment of Legislative Route 58 between US 101 near Santa Margarita and State Route 33 at McKittrick was not signed prior to 1964.

Note that US 466 was co-signed with US 99, now State Route 99, between Bakersfield and Famoso Junction. Between Famoso and US 101 at Paso Robles, US 466 largely became SR 46.

The eastern terminus was originally at I-15 in northeastern Barstow. The former eastern terminus is now known as "Old Highway 58".

Westside Parkway and the Centennial Corridor Project
In western Bakersfield, the Westside Parkway, a freeway running from Stockdale Highway (near Heath Road) east to Truxtun Avenue, was completed on April 15, 2015, with interchanges in between at Allen Road, Calloway Drive, Coffee Road, and Mohawk Street. Opening in stages since 2013, the road was originally under the jurisdiction of the city of Bakersfield. As part of the Centennial Corridor project, Caltrans is building an eastern extension of the Westside Parkway to the current junction of SR 58 and SR 99 at the West Bakersfield Interchange. Although construction was controversial since it displaced dozens of homes and businesses, by September 2017, all but a few buildings in the path had been demolished. In October 2022, city officials announced that the project was nearly complete, and that they were working on the last 800 feet of the connection, specifically, the northbound SR 99 to westbound Westside Parkway (future SR 58) transition ramp, with an estimated 8 months of construction left. Once the connection to SR 99 is completed (which is expected to occur in fall 2023), SR 58 will then be rerouted onto Stockdale Highway and the Westside Parkway, with later plans to upgrade Stockdale Highway from Heath Road west to Interstate 5 as a freeway. Bakersfield has already begun the transfer process, and the Westside Parkway is under Caltrans and California Highway Patrol jurisdiction effective February 5, 2021.

Business loops

Mojave

State Route 58 Business is a business route of California State Route 58 in Mojave. It provides access to downtown Mojave as Mojave-Barstow Highway. It also follows  mostly the former routing of U.S. Route 466.

Tehachapi

State Route 58 Business is a business route of California State Route 58 in Tehachapi. It provides access to downtown Tehachapi as Tehachapi Boulevard. It also follows the former routing of U.S. Route 466 and is overlapped with State Route 202.

Boron

State Route 58 Business is a business route of California State Route 58 in Boron. It provides access to downtown Boron as Twenty Mule Team Road. It also follows the former routing of U.S. Route 466. It is signed from westbound Route 58 approaching the San Bernardino–Kern county line and the beginning of the Boron bypass.

Major intersections

Westside Parkway (Future SR 58)
This exit list consists of the former Bakersfield city-maintained freeway (now maintained by Caltrans) that will eventually become part of SR 58. Exit numbers have not yet been posted on this freeway segment.

See also

References

External links

 Caltrans: Route 58 highway conditions
 California Highways State Route 58
California @ AARoads.com - State Route 58

058
058
State Route 058
State Route 058
State Route 058
Mojave Desert
San Joaquin Valley
Tehachapi Mountains
Interstate 40
U.S. Route 66 in California
Transportation in Bakersfield, California